Rex Joseph Kodippili  (born 6 October 1938: Sinhala:රෙක්ස් කොඩිප්පිලි) is a Sri Lankan film actor and film director. Primarily acted as a villain for the most of his career, Kodippili appeared in more than 130 films and produced two films. In 2019, he was honored with Janabhimani Honorary Award at the Bandaranaike Memorial International Conference Hall.

Personal life
Rex Joseph Kodippili is born on 6 October 1938 in Badulla, Sri Lanka as the youngest of the family. His father Don Henry Kodippili was a surveyor. His mother was Ethan Kodippili. His father died when he was 18 months old by a flooding occurred in Trincomalee district. Along with his two brothers, he was raised by his mother. He along with his two brothers completed education from St. Bede's College. Badulla. Though his brothers left the school early, Rex was boarded in the school. After Ordinary Level, he attended to Sri Siddhartha Central College, Badulla.

After completing school life, he joined Police department. In 1958, he came to Colombo with the job. At the Apprentice Passing Out Ceremony, Rex finished second out of four hundred soldiers. He served for five years in police department and departed in 1961. While in the military, he played boxing, swimming and was the leader of the first swimming team of the military police. Kodippili was a physical training instructor in the Military Police. He was then employed as a manager at the Marina Café and Hotel at Pettah, before becoming the manager at Salaka.

He was married to Katherine where he met on a marriage proposal. The couple had two daughters: Roshanthi and Sureka, and one son: Prasanna. His wife Katherine died in 2016.

Acting career
According to him, he was very good at singing than acting. A gifted singer, he was popularly known as 'Badulla Mohideen Beg' in the Badulla area. He started singing since very little stage and also Won second place in the grand final of the 'Adunika Peya' program of the late 1950s radio commercial service where the award received from the hands of late prime minister S.W.R.D. Bandaranaike at the age of seven. He joined a drama circle named as "Rohana Dramatic Society" while at the Siddhartha College. They performed about five stage dramas including Maraka Daivaya and Sangeetha Pissa. After five-year police service, he Joined the "Adunika Peya" of the Sri Lanka Broadcasting Corporation. In that competition, he won the second place and Nanda Malini won the first place. Then he got involved in programs like Nevum Mihira as well as recorded around five solo tracks.

While working in Hotel Salaka, he became friends with Oswald Jayasinghe and Dommie Jayawardena. In 1969, while he was dropping Jayasinghe off at a film location in Nugegoda, the film's director, K. A. W. Perera, approached him and cast him in the role of a pick-pocket in the film Kathuru Muwath. In the meantime, he had the opportunity to do "double" roles in action scenes for the lead actors in movie fight scenes including stunt double for Senadheera Rupasinghe in the film Hathara Denama Soorayo. In 1972, he appeared in the film Lokuma Hinawa directed by K. A. W. During a stunt in the film, he broke his leg and was hospitalized for nine months.

However in 1973, he joined another stunt role in the film Aparadaya Saha Danduwama. In the film, Oswald Jayasinghe and Rex had a deadly fight where the scene was filmed on a big rock on Maligathenna hill. He fell to the ground with a quick blow from Oswald. As he was falling from the hill, he was lucky enough to hanging from a tree branch. The branch shattered into a pile of glass on the ground. Later, he was hospitalized with serious injuries and rested for three weeks. In the 1974 film Onna Babo Billo Enavo, he had a stunt scene where he climbed a helicopter with difficulty and fought with Gamini Fonseka. In the following years, he appeared in several action films such as Duppathage Hithawatha, Kalyani Ganga and Maruwa Samaga Wase.

In 1976, he made his first romantic role with the film Lassana Dawadak. Then he moved to more dramatic roles than action stunt roles. Some of his most notable character roles came through the characters such as: 'Kadira' in the film Muwan Pelessa, 'Daanu' in the film Raktha, 'Ratne Ayya' in the film Sagarika and 'Sergeant Silva' in the film Koti Waligaya. In 1987, he won the merit award at the 1987 Sarasaviya Awards for his performance in the film Koti Waligaya.

In 1982, he became a producer with the film Bicycale. In the film, he was also the screenwriter. The theme of the film is boxing, which has never been discussed in a movie.

Filmography

As an actor

As a producer

References

1939 births
Living people
Sri Lankan male film actors